Sanyo Electric Redthor is a women's volleyball team based in Daito city, Osaka, Japan. It plays in V.Challenge League. The club was founded in 1962.
The owner of the team is Sanyo Electric. "Thor" stems from Norse mythology.

History
It was founded in 1962.
It promoted to V.Challenge League in 2002.

Honours
V.Challenge League
Champions(2) - 2004,2007
Runner-Up(1) - 2009

League results

Current squad
As of November 2011
 2    Aya Watanabe
 3    Yuki Sasaki (Captain)
 4    Yukari Amano
 6    Moe Sasaki
 9    Mika Terasawa
 10  Natsuki Kitakami
 13  Mami Suda
 15  Chiaki Yokoe
 16  Yuka Matsuno
 17  Tomomi Shinjo
 18  Natsumi Shimamura

Former players
  Miki Shimada
  Hiromi Hatanaka
  Eri Kosaka
  Aya Sakata
  Yu Tsuchitani
  Nozomi Yamasaki
  Yuki Kimura
  Hiroka Yamada
  Eri Tokugawa
  Sayaka Nakano
  Ayako Hoshi
  Asaka Kurokawa
  Yoko Hayashi

External links
 Official Website

Japanese volleyball teams